Direct development is a concept in biology.  It refers to forms of growth to adulthood that do not involve metamorphosis.  An animal undergoes direct development if the immature organism resembles a small adult rather than having a distinct larval form.  A frog that hatches out of its egg as a small frog undergoes direct development.  A frog that hatches out of its egg as a tadpole does not.

Direct development is the opposite of complete metamorphosis.  An animal undergoes complete metamorphosis if it becomes a non-moving thing, for example a pupa in a cocoon, between its larval and adult stages.

Examples

Most frogs in the genus Callulina hatch out of their eggs as froglets.
Springtails and mayflies, called ametabolous insects, undergo direct development.

References

Biology
Animal anatomy